Neza Fútbol Club, also known as Toros Neza is a Mexican football team based in the city of Nezahualcóyotl. They play in the Liga de Balompié Mexicano.

The club returned for the Clausura 2011 Liga de Ascenso tournament, taking the place of Atlante UTN who had been purchased by Grupo Salinas
. An earlier Toros Neza side played in the Mexican Primera División in the 1990s.

History
Toros Neza was promoted after winning the championship of the Segunda División in the 1992–93 season (under the name "Toros de la Universidad Tecnológica de Neza") to the Mexican Primera División in the 1993–94 season as Toros Neza, taking the place of Pachuca who had been relegated from the Primera División. There have been several clubs that played in the city of Neza, such as Deportivo Neza, which had a short stay in the first division in the 1970s when after 4 years the club was sold.

In 1993–94 they finished bottom of their group, and played their last 14 home games in Pachuca, changing their name to Toros Neza Hidalgo. However, the following season they were known again as Toros Neza.

In the 1996–97 tournament they reached the semi-finals in the Apertura. They bettered this in the Clausura, reaching the final where they lost to C.D. Guadalajara. However, they were relegated at the end of the 1999–2000 season.

Return of Neza
In December 2010 it was announced that Neza would be returning to the professional ranks for the Clausura stage of the 2010–11 Liga de Ascenso season. They will be the filial team of Monarcas Morelia, and ultimately be owned by TV Azteca.

They effectively took the place of the Atlante UTN team who competed in the Apertura 2010 tournament. The Monarcas Morelia and Atlante clubs swapped their filial teams, and the changed team were known as Neza FC starting with the Clausura 2011 tournament.

When the new calendar for the 2015-16 Segunda División season came out once again the team had dissolved.

2nd Return of Neza
A team called Neza FC is due to compete in the Liga de Balompié Méxicano for the league's first season, 2020–21, as a continuation of Toros Neza.

Players

First-team squad

Notable former players 

  German Arangio
  Daniel Garnero
  Federico Lussenhoff
  Antonio Mohamed
  Martín Vilallonga
  Bebeto
  Nildeson
  Rodrigo Ruiz
  Luis Carlos Perea
  Efraín Munguia
  Pedro Pineda
  Jesús López Meneses
  Félix Cruz
  Miguel Herrera
  Pablo Larios
  Oscar Mascorro
  Manuel Negrete
  Juan de Dios Ramírez
  Camilo Romero
  Humberto Romero
  Javier Saavedra
  Guillermo Vázquez
  Óscar Dautt
  Jörg Stiel

Player Records

Top scorers

Competition record

Ascenso MX record

Copa MX record

Honours
Segunda División de México:
1992-93
Liga de Ascenso:
Runner-up: Verano 2001
Ascenso MX:
 Clausura 2013
Ascenso:
Runner-up: 2012-13
Mexican Primera División:
Runner-up: Verano 1997
Copa Mexico:
Runner-up: 1996-97
Copa Parma:
1997

Kit evolution and rare kits

References

External links
Official website
Official Facebook

 
Football clubs in the State of Mexico
Liga de Balompié Mexicano Teams